In pencil and paper games and computer and video games, an item is an object within the game world that can be collected by a player or, occasionally, a non-player character. These items are sometimes called pick-ups.

Items are most often beneficial to the player character. Some games contain detrimental items, such as cursed pieces of armor that confers a negative bonus to the wearer and cannot be removed until the curse itself is lifted; the means to do this may be costly or require a special item. Some items may also be of absolutely no value to the player. Items are especially prevalent in role-playing games, as they are usually necessary for the completion of quests or to advance through the story.

Sometimes certain items may be unique, and only appear once at a specific location, often after completing a particular task. Other items may appear frequently, and not give a big bonus alone, but when many are collected. Games may differ on how the player uses an item. Some games, many in the Mario and Sonic series, an item is automatically used when the player character comes into contact with it. There are also games, such as those in the Streets of Rage series, and the first Prince of Persia games where the player character may walk over an item without collecting it, if they do not need it yet, and the player must push a particular button for the character to collect it, but it still used immediately, when the button is pressed. Other times, some games, like many role playing games, an item can be collected either automatically or manually, but will not be used immediately, the item can be carried around and used manually either straight away if they wish or at a later time when the player needs it.

Types
Items often come in various types and in most games where items are collected, they are sorted by these types. In RPGs, an item inventory is a common UI feature where one can view all the items that have been collected thus far. Often, these are sorted by categories, such as "equipment" or "potions." In other game genres, the items may take effect as soon as they are obtained.

In platform games

In many platformers, like Sonic the Hedgehog and Super Mario Bros., items are scattered throughout the level in item boxes or on their own. Many video game items are common to all games.

1-ups or continues give the player character "extra lives" and allow them to continue after being killed. 1-ups usually come in the form of the main character's face (or the text "1UP," though this is less common in modern games.) In some games, they can also be obtained in special stages and by collecting a large number of minor treasure items (i.e., collect 100 rings in Sonic games to gain one extra life.), by finishing levels in a certain amount of time, or by getting a certain number of points.

Treasure such as coins, rings, gems or jewelry are another common item. These are often used to determine the player's score. In some games, particularly those with an overworld map, players can take these items to a shop-like place and exchange them for new abilities or equipment. Usually, such treasure items are found in small quantities as one progresses through a level. However, by exploring, players can often find secret areas containing a large number of them.

In some platformers, particularly those with a hit counter such as the  Kirby games, medicine, food or energy containers are found, which give the player extra health or defensive ability. These are normally very rare, so as to make the player watch their hit counter carefully. In some games, such as the Sonic series, the treasure items (rings) double as a method of enabling extra hits.

Quest items (also known as plot items or key items) are required to complete several games or stages. In platformers, these are not always required, but may be optional goals to get a better ending. The Sonic the Hedgehog series has a recurring side goal being the collection of the Chaos Emeralds.

In adventure games

Often in adventure games there are many puzzles that need to be completed in order for the player to advance through the dungeons or levels. Usually, this can be done through the use of specific items gathered while exploring the dungeon. This is a very common element in the Legend of Zelda series, where items like the hookshot are necessary to pass specific obstacles, or games like the Metroid series, where items like the gravity suit or power bombs are required to pass to another area. Other important items for navigating puzzles are bombs, which can open new paths, and the boomerang, which can retrieve items from a great distance. In Minecraft, items range from weapons to tools to miscellaneous things like music discs or spawn eggs. While no items are required for completion of puzzles or to access certain areas, they are mandatory for progression in the game and for defeating the bosses.

Another generic item needed to progress through dungeons in adventure games is the key. Sometimes there can be several keys within a dungeon, or just one skeleton key which is good enough to open all locked doors.

In shooting games

Items in shooter games are not as common as in other genres, however, they still play a major role in the gameplay. The most common items are the health pack, similar to a potion in RPGs, and the ammunition pack, a generic box of ammo that will work with whatever gun the player character has equipped at that time. Sometimes, in games with large amounts of different weapons, there will also be specialized ammo packs, like napalm canisters or rockets/grenades for rocket and grenade launchers, respectively.

In most games, new weapons can be obtained, normally from defeated enemy soldiers but also from machines or robots depending on the game's setting. Generally, more powerful weapons (such as the aforementioned rocket launchers and flamethrowers) tend to be found later in the game. In some games that cross genres, like Twisted Metal, the weapons come in the form of powerups that have very limited duration.

In fighting games
In fighting games, items are far less common, however they still appear in many titles. In wrestling games, things like folding chairs and other innocuous items are often used as makeshift weapons, sometimes with a limited number of "uses" before the item breaks. In the Super Smash Bros. series, items play an important role in the combat, and the timely arrival of a certain item, like invincibility or the hammer, can completely alter the course of the fight.

In sports games
Popular sports games generally convey their items in a similar form to trading cards, with the items composing of players, staff (managers/medical specialists/skill coaches), consumable items and stadiums. One of the most popular sports game FIFA Ultimate Team evaluates real world sports athletes performances with scouts that watch the athletes perform at games and then applies their performance statistics unto the cards (in game) with different colours and versions of cards to display their hierarchy in skill level. As with trading cards the rarity of cards are based on how accomplished the athlete is along with their level of performance and current form.

Bibliography 
 
 
 
 
 
 

 
Video game terminology